Counter-Strike (CS) is a series of multiplayer tactical first-person shooter video games in which teams of terrorists battle to perpetrate an act of terror (bombing, hostage-taking, assassination) while counter-terrorists try to prevent it (bomb defusal, hostage rescue, escort mission). The series began on Windows in 1999 with the release of the first game, Counter-Strike. It was initially released as a modification ("mod") for Half-Life that was designed by Minh "Gooseman" Le and Jess "Cliffe" Cliffe before the rights to the mod's intellectual property were acquired by Valve, the developers of Half-Life, who then turned Counter-Strike into a retail product released in 2000.

The original Counter-Strike was followed by Counter-Strike: Condition Zero, developed by Turtle Rock Studios and released in March 2004. A previous version of Condition Zero that was developed by Ritual Entertainment was released alongside it as Condition Zero: Deleted Scenes. Eight months later, Valve released Counter-Strike: Source, a remake of the original Counter-Strike and the first in the series to run on Valve's newly created Source engine. The fourth game in the main series, Counter-Strike: Global Offensive, was released by Valve in 2012 for Windows, OS X, Xbox 360, and PlayStation 3. Hidden Path Entertainment, who worked on Counter-Strike: Source post-release, helped to develop the game alongside Valve.

There have been several third-party spin-off titles created for Asian markets over the years. These include the Counter-Strike Online series, Counter-Strike Neo, and Counter-Strike Nexon: Studio.

Gameplay 
Counter-Strike is an objective-based, multiplayer tactical first-person shooter. Two opposing teams—the Terrorists and the Counter Terrorists—compete in game modes to complete objectives, such as securing a location to plant or defuse a bomb and rescuing or guarding hostages. At the end of each round, players are rewarded based on their individual performance with in-game currency to spend on more powerful weapons in subsequent rounds. Winning rounds results in more money than losing and completing objectives such as killing enemy players gives cash bonuses. Uncooperative actions, such as killing teammates, results in a penalty.

Main series

Counter-Strike 

Originally a modification for Half-Life, the rights to Counter-Strike, as well as the developers working on it, were acquired by Valve in 2000.

The game received a port to Xbox in 2003. It was also ported to OS X and Linux in the form of a beta in January 2013. A full release was published in April 2013.

Condition Zero 

Counter-Strike was followed-up with Counter-Strike: Condition Zero, developed by Turtle Rock Studios and released in 2004. It used the Half-Life GoldSrc engine, similar to its predecessor. Besides the multiplayer mode, it also included a single-player mode with a "full" campaign and bonus levels. The game received mixed reviews in contrast to its predecessor and was quickly followed with a further entry to the series titled Counter-Strike: Source.

Source 

Counter-Strike: Source was the first publicly released game by Valve to run on the Source engine. Counter-Strike: Source was initially released as a beta to members of the Valve Cyber Café Program on August 11, 2004. On August 18, 2004, the beta was released to owners of Counter-Strike: Condition Zero and those who had received a Half-Life 2 voucher bundled with some ATI Radeon video cards. While the original release only included a version for Microsoft Windows, the game eventually received a port to OS X on June 23, 2010, with a Linux port afterwards in 2013.

Global Offensive 

Counter-Strike: Global Offensive was the fourth release in the main, Valve-developed Counter-Strike series in 2012. Much like Counter-Strike: Source the game runs on the Source engine. It is available on Microsoft Windows, OSX, and Linux, as well as the Xbox 360 and PlayStation 3 consoles, and is backwards compatible on the Xbox One console.

Spin-offs

Neo 
A Japanese arcade adaptation of Counter-Strike, the original Half-Life multiplayer modification. It is published by Namco and runs on a Linux system. The game involves anime-designed characters in a futuristic designed version of Counter-Strike.  A selection of single-player missions, mini-games, and seasonal events were added to prolong the game's interest with players.

Online series 

Counter-Strike Online is a free-to-play spin-off available in much of eastern Asia. It was developed by Nexon, with oversight from Valve. It uses a micropayment model that is managed by a custom version of the Steam back-end. Announced in 2012 and aimed at the Asian gaming market, a sequel titled Counter-Strike Online 2 was developed by Nexon on the Source game engine and released in 2013.

Nexon: Studio 
In August 2014, Nexon announced Counter-Strike Nexon: Zombies, a free-to-play, zombie-themed spin-off, developed on the GoldSrc game engine. On September 23, 2014, an open beta was released on Steam. The game launched on October 7, 2014, featuring 50 maps and 20 game modes.  The game features both player versus player modes such as team deathmatch, hostage rescue, bomb defusal, and player versus environment modes such as cooperative campaign missions and base defending. Reception from critics was generally negative with criticism aimed at the game's poor user interface, microtransactions, and dated graphics. On October 30, 2019, Counter-Strike Nexon: Zombies was renamed to Counter-Strike Nexon: Studio.

Competitive play

Counter-Strike has over 20 years of competitive play beginning with the original Counter-Strike. The first major tournament was hosted in 2001 at the Cyberathlete Professional League. Cyberathlete Professional League, along with World Cyber Games and Electronic Sports World Cup were among the largest tournaments for the Counter-Strike series until 2007. Since 2013, Valve have sponsored Counter-Strike: Global Offensive Major Championships with large prize pools and have become the most prestigious tournaments in CS:GO.

Reception
Counter-Strike is considered one of the most influential first person shooters in history. The series has a large competitive community and has become synonymous with first person shooters. , the Counter-Strike franchise has sold over 25 million units. The game remains very popular as one of the most actively played games on Steam.

References

Asymmetrical multiplayer video games
Counter-Strike
First-person shooters
Online games
Tactical shooter video games
Valve Corporation franchises
Valve Corporation games
Video game franchises
Video game franchises introduced in 1999
Video games about bomb disposal